The Rosedale Plantation Barn is a historic barn at 879 Old Military Road in Arkadelphia, Arkansas. It is the last surviving structure of a slave plantation that was established in 1860, and was disassembled and reconstructed at its present location in 2002 to save it from demolition. It is believed to be the largest log barn in the state.

The barn was listed on the National Register of Historic Places in 2004.

See also
National Register of Historic Places listings in Clark County, Arkansas

References

Commercial buildings completed in 1860
Buildings and structures in Arkadelphia, Arkansas
Barns on the National Register of Historic Places in Arkansas
National Register of Historic Places in Clark County, Arkansas